Ficus craterostoma, a species of strangler fig, is a fig shrub or tree of the Afrotropics that may grow up to 20 m tall. It is found in lowland tropical and swamp forests in the west, or in afromontane forests, including rocky situations, along Africa's eastern escarpments. The western and eastern populations may constitute separate species, as they occur at different altitudes where their ranges meet in central Africa, while they seem to have exclusive pollinating wasp species.

Foliage
 
Their dark, small leaves are obovate to blunt-tipped (reverse triangular) or even concave at the tip.  The leaves of F. natalensis are similar, though more rounded and never concave at the tip.

Figs
The small, stalkless figs grow in pairs in leaf axils. They measure from 0.5 to 1 cm in diameter and assume a yellowish red colour when ripe. Without the presence of the pollinating wasp, the figs will abort and are dropped in large numbers. The pollinating wasp of the western and eastern populations are Alfonsiella michaloudi and Alfonsiella pipithiensis respectively.

References

External links

Trees of Africa
Taxa named by Max Burret
Taxa named by Johannes Mildbraed